Riikka Pirjo Maaria Slunga-Poutsalo (born 23 April 1971 in Alatornio) is a Finnish politician currently serving in the Parliament of Finland for the Finns Party at the Uusimaa constituency.

References

1971 births
Living people
People from Tornio
Finns Party politicians
Members of the Parliament of Finland (2019–23)
21st-century Finnish women politicians
Women members of the Parliament of Finland